Babe was a Dutch girl-pop band in the 1970s and 1980s. The producer was Peter Koelewijn.

History 
Babe was designed after Luv', another very famous Dutch girl-pop band, mostly performing bubblegum pop.

The trio was formed by producer and performer Peter Koelewijn, and he produced all of their records. The only exception was the single Tick-a-thumps my heart which was produced by Hans van Hemert, the producer behind Luv'. Koelewijn had made this decision because he felt a change in sound was needed for the trio. However, fans did not appreciate the new sound, which was very much like Luv' because it no longer featured the recognizable solo vocals by Gemma Van Eck, but instead was sung in harmony by all three singers, so Koelewijn decided to take production back.

Initially the group consisted of Gemma van Eck, Rita van Rooy and Monique Hagemeyer. Hagemeyer was replaced in 1980 by Margot van der Ven. Van Eck decided to leave the trio in 1981 and was replaced by Marga Bult.

Although very popular at the time, Babe is considered the band in the Netherlands that had the most Top 40 hits without ever having a single placing within the top 10.

One of their singles, The Drunken Sailor was an old Irish sailor song, transformed into a bubblegum tune by Koelewijn.

In 1980 the trio participated in a famous song festival in Korea, performed for the Dutch Military in Lebanon, toured extensively through Indonesia, and made appearances in several TV-shows in then East-Germany and Poland.

The trio finally disbanded in 1986 after their fame had gotten less and their music did not find many fans any longer. They did a final performance at the TT van Assen.

Marga Bult continued with a fairly successful solo career, which included her entry to the Eurovision Song Contest in 1987, where she performed "Rechtop in the wind" under the pseudonym Marcha. With 83 points she finished in a respectful 5th place in a field of 22 entries.

Discography

Albums 
Babe 1980

Blitzers 1981

Shop Around 1983

Hollands Glorie 2003

Singles 
Please me, please do 1979

(Never listen to a) Bouzouki player 1979

Wonderboy 1979

Ooh la la, I'm falling 1980

The drunken sailor/The Spanish shuffle 1980

The kiss (Viva los hombres) 1980

L.O.V.E. 1980

My Malaysia 1980

Mister Blitzer 1981

Tick-a-thumps my heart/Watch out for the big jump 1981

I'm a rocking machine 1981

Indian habits (Hooka Heya) 1982

Together in love again 1982

Explosive 1983

(Don't you ever) Shop around 1983

Dolly the doll 1983

Tommy is a winner 1984

Wanna do (what mamma said) 1984

Minnie the moocher 1984

Hot shot 1985

Tell him 1985

Dutch girl groups
Musical groups from Eindhoven
Musical groups established in 1979